Donja Lomnica may refer to:

 Donja Lomnica (Vlasotince), a village near Vlasotince, Serbia
 Donja Lomnica, Croatia, a village near Velika Gorica, Croatia